Papakha is a wool hat worn by men throughout the Caucasus and also in uniformed regiments in the region and beyond. The word papakha is of Turkic origin (papakh).

Styles

There are two different  Caucasian papakhas. One, called a papaha, is a high fur hat, usually made of karakul sheepskin. The hat has the general appearance of a cylinder with one open end and is set upon the head in such a way as to have the brim touch the temples. Some examples have ear-flaps which can be folded up when not in use. The other style is called a kubanka, and is similar to the papaha, but shorter and without ear-flaps.

Prevalence

Papaqs are very important to mountainous peoples’ of the Caucasus, where a man's hat is considered a very important part of his identity. Papakhi are donned by the Circassians, Chechens, Dagestanis, Ingush and other Caucasian tribes. Papakhas are also donned in Georgia mostly worn in mountainous regions of Pshavi, Khevi, Mtiuleti, and Tusheti. In 1855, after the campaigns in the Caucasus Mountains, the Papakha was introduced in the Russian army as an official part of the uniform for the Cossacks, and later for the rest of the cavalry. Papaq is also very common in Azerbaijan, Armenia, Turkmenistan, Uzbekistan, as well as among the Uyghurs.

Russian and Soviet army uniforms 

Shortly after the Russian Revolution of 1917, papakhas were removed from the new Red Army uniform because of their association with the old Tsarist regime and the fact that many Cossack regiments of the Tsarist army fought against the Bolsheviks. During the Russian Civil War, many Bolshevik cavalrymen and officers (like Vasily Chapayev) wore papakhas or kubankas because many of them were cossacks and the hat had been part of the cavalryman's uniform.

Papakhas became part of the uniform again in 1935, but in 1941, were reserved exclusively for full colonels, generals and marshals, thus becoming a symbol of status and high rank. Much later, during Andrei Grechko's tenure as a Defence Minister, the Navy followed suit, introducing their own distinct version resembling a smallish "kubanka" with a visor, which was nicknamed "шапка с ручкой" ("the hat with a handle") by the troops.

In 1994, they were once again removed from military use. Allegedly this was by request of the wearers, who found the hat inefficient. (As the papakha is a relatively short hat that does not protect the ears well, it might be well suited to the mild climate of the Caucasus, but not to lower temperatures elsewhere. The act of removing the papakhas was seen in some quarters as an attempt by the Boris Yeltsin regime to abandon earlier Soviet traditions and symbolically demonstrate the country's commitment to a new political course. In 2005 however, papakhas were reinstated.

Contemporary papakha

The Papakha's heritage comes from Central Asia and the Caucasus and is worn across the entire region, including Azerbaijan, Georgia, Armenia, and North Caucasus, as well as Russia and Ukraine.

Gallery

See also 
 Busby
 Kalpak
 Karakul (hat)
 Ushanka, Russian fur hat with "ear flaps"

References

External links 
 

1850s fashion
19th-century fashion
20th-century fashion
21st-century fashion
Armenian clothing
Azerbaijani clothing
Clothing of Georgia (country)
Russian folk clothing
Hats
Military organization of Cossacks
Uniforms